Martynovo is a rural locality (a selo) and the administrative center of Martynovsky Selsoviet, Yeltsovsky District, Altai Krai, Russia. The population was 1,252 as of 2013. There are 23 streets.

Geography 
Martynovo is located 29 km west of Yeltsovka (the district's administrative centre) by road. Bragino is the nearest rural locality.

References 

Rural localities in Yeltsovsky District